Hemiphyllodactylus zayuensis is a species of gecko. It is endemic to Tibet and named after its type locality, Zayü.

References

Hemiphyllodactylus
Reptiles of China
Endemic fauna of Tibet
Reptiles described in 2020